The 1958–59 FA Cup was the 78th staging of the world's oldest football cup competition, the Football Association Challenge Cup, commonly known as the FA Cup. Nottingham Forest won the competition for their second time, as of 2022, beating Luton Town 2–1 in the final at Wembley. This is Luton Town's only appearance in an FA Cup final as of 2022.

Matches were scheduled to be played at the stadium of the team named first on the date specified for each round, which was always a Saturday. Some matches, however, might be rescheduled for other days if there were clashes with games for other competitions or the weather was inclement. If scores were level after 90 minutes had been played, a replay would take place at the stadium of the second-named team later the same week. If the replayed match was drawn further replays would be held until a winner was determined. If scores were level after 90 minutes had been played in a replay, a 30-minute period of extra time would be played.

The competition saw the remarkable progress of Norwich City, then a Division Three team, to the semi-finals, defeating Manchester United and Tottenham Hotspur along the way, before losing in a replay to Luton Town. The "59 Cup Run" takes a notable place in Norwich's club history.

Calendar

First round proper

At this stage clubs from the Third and Fourth divisions joined the 30 non-league clubs having come through the qualifying rounds. To complete this round, Woking and Ilford given byes. Matches were scheduled to be played on Saturday, 15 November 1958, although the Bury–York City match was postponed. Ten were drawn and went to replays, with one of those going to a second replay.

Second round proper
The matches were scheduled for Saturday, 6 December 1958. Six matches were drawn, with replays taking place later the same week. One match went to a second replay.

Third round proper
The 44 First and Second Division clubs entered the competition at this stage. The matches were scheduled for Saturday, 10 January 1959, although six matches were postponed until later dates. Six matches were drawn and went to replays.

Fourth round proper
The matches were scheduled for Saturday, 24 January 1959, with three matches taking place on later dates. Six matches were drawn and went to replays, which were all played in the following midweek match.

Fifth round proper
The matches were scheduled for Saturday, 14 February 1959. Four matches went to replays in the following midweek fixture, with two of these requiring a second replay to settle the tie.

Sixth round proper
The four quarter-final ties were scheduled to be played on Saturday, 28 February 1959. Three of the four games went to replays.

Semi finals
The semi-final matches were played on Saturday, 14 March 1959. Nottingham Forest and Luton Town won their matches to meet in the final at Wembley.

Replay

Final

The FA Cup final took place on 2 May 1959, at Wembley Stadium and was won by Nottingham Forest, beating Luton Town 2–1.

References
General
The FA Cup Archive at TheFA.com
F.A. Cup results 1958/59 at Footballsite
Specific

 
FA Cup seasons